Markus Braun (born 1969) is an Austrian tech investor and digital entrepreneur. From January 2002 until his resignation and arrest in June 2020, he was the CEO and CTO at the now insolvent payment processor, Wirecard AG. Braun stepped down from Wirecard amidst fraud allegations, but has denied any wrongdoing. Court cases are pending as of 2023.

Education 
Braun graduated from the Technical University of Vienna with a degree in commercial computer science and business studies
, and then went on to earn a PhD in social and economic sciences from the University of Vienna in 2000.

Career 
Braun started his career as a consultant at Contrast Management Consulting GmbH, a position he held until November 1998. Between 1998 and 2001, he worked with KPMG Consulting AG in Munich.

Wirecard 
In 2002, Braun joined the management board of Wirecard AG and became CEO and CTO of the company. Wirecard was one of the world's largest digital platforms in the area of financial commerce and is headquartered in Germany. It was one of Germany's Top 30 most valuable companies on the German stock market (DAX) and has been ranked in the “Top 100 Most Innovative Growth Companies in the World” by Forbes Magazine.

In 2017, Braun was reappointed as a CEO of Wirecard. He responded to his reappointment by stating: "We will drive the digitization of payment processes using internet technology on a global level, and we will make Wirecard a global leader in this sector." Much of what Braun has said was questioned long before Wirecard has admitted fraud in June 2020. In 2017, for example, Braun told investors that Wirecard was using the latest artificial intelligence technology to analyze data. However according to third parties, staff were instead cobbling together spreadsheets of customer information. Braun owns more than 7% of Wirecard shares.

Resignation and arrest

In June 2020, Braun stepped down as CEO after more than US$2 billion was found missing from the company accounts. In late 2017, Deutsche Bank loaned Braun €150 million and accepted half of his 7% share in Wirecard as collateral. The loan was not renewed after the company was accused of accounting fraud. On 22 June, Braun was detained by German police "on suspicion of accounting fraud and market manipulation" after he had turned himself in. On 23 June, he was released on bail, set at 5 million Euros ($5.7 million). On 22 July, he was arrested again.

In March 2022, Munich public prosecutors charged him with fraud, breach of trust and accounting manipulation.  If found guilty on all these charges, he could face up to 15 years in prison. Braun maintains that he is innocent and himself a victim of fraud.

Positions 
Braun has more than 15 years of experience in the digital payment industry and was a regular speaker at industry related events as well as different national and international media.

According to Braun, in the next decade, the entire retail payment infrastructure will be replaced by technology  merging all payment streams into a single, fully digital system. Braun stated, that digitalization, if done right, would generate an increase in sales for the brick and mortar business similar to the expanding online commerce. He considers cash to become an exception and says, that technology can never be justified by itself and can only be successful when it delivers visible value-added for customers and merchants.

References

External links
 

Living people
TU Wien alumni
Austrian billionaires
1969 births
Austrian chief executives